Haiti competed at the 2010 Summer Youth Olympics, the inaugural Youth Olympic Games, held in Singapore from 14 August to 26 August 2010.

Medalists

Athletics

Girls
Track and Road Events

Football

Judo

Individual

Team

Taekwondo

References

External links
Competitors List: Haiti – Singapore 2010 official site

2010 in Haitian sport
Nations at the 2010 Summer Youth Olympics
Haiti at the Youth Olympics